Selkirk is a city in the western Canadian province of Manitoba, located on the Red River about  northeast of the provincial capital Winnipeg. It has a population of 10,504 as of the 2021 census.

The mainstays of the local economy are tourism, a steel mill, and a psychiatric hospital. A vertical lift bridge over the Red River connects Selkirk with the smaller town of East Selkirk. The city is connected to Winnipeg via Highway 9 and is served by the Canadian Pacific Railway.

The city was named in honour of Scotsman Thomas Douglas, 5th Earl of Selkirk, who obtained the grant to establish a colony in the Red River area in 1813.

History

The present-day city is near the centre of the  area purchased by the Earl of Selkirk from the Hudson's Bay Company. The first settlers of the Red River Colony arrived in 1813. Although the settlers negotiated a treaty with the Saulteaux Indians of the area, the commercial rivalry between the Hudson's Bay Company and the North West Company gave rise to violent confrontations between the settlers and the trading companies. In recognition of the Earl's importance in bringing settlers to the region, the town was named Selkirk and incorporated in 1882.

Economy

Entertainment

Selkirk is advertised as the Catfish Capital of the World due to the large amounts of catfish in the nearby Red River. This nickname was part of an advertising campaign to attract American anglers to fish for trophy-sized catfish. The catfish was named after local sport fisherman Chuck Norquay, who drowned while doing what he loved most: fishing in the Red River. After Chuck was built in 1986, the town council decided to place Chuck in front of Smitty's Restaurant on Main Street.

The Marine Museum of Manitoba, a collection of historical marine artifacts of Lake Winnipeg and the Red River area, is located in Selkirk. Selkirk is also the site of a Canadian Coast Guard base.

The yearly Selkirk Fair and Rodeo is held to celebrate the area's agricultural history. It celebrated its 130th anniversary in 2008.

Employment
The Selkirk Mental Health Centre, the largest mental health facility in the province, is a major employer in the city. It is surrounded by a park-like campus on the outskirts of the city.

Gerdau, owned by Gerdau S.A. of Porto Alegre, Brazil, operates a steel minimill in Selkirk. This steel mill (known locally as MRM or "The Manitoba Rolling Mills") is another major employer.

Selkirk has three community newspapers: The Interlake Enterprise, The Selkirk Record, and The Selkirk Journal.

Amphibex excavator icebreakers were at work breaking up ice flows on the Red River in 2009. Ice breakers and backhoes were to be strategically placed along the Red River Floodway, which might have needed to be opened before the ice was fully melted. Officials examined past ice jams and provided contingency plans if the Floodway jammed upstream of bridges or on tight corners.

Sports
Selkirk is home to the Selkirk Steelers of the Manitoba Junior Hockey League, who play in the Selkirk Recreation Complex. Selkirk is also home to the Selkirk Fishermen of the Capital Region Junior Hockey League.

Selkirk has hosted major events in conjunction with the city of Winnipeg, such as select games of the 2007 Women's World Ice Hockey Championships.  In 2009, Selkirk was host to the Telus Cup, Canada's national midget hockey championship, with the Winnipeg Thrashers as the host team.  The Notre Dame Hounds defeated the Calgary Buffaloes 4–0 in the gold medal game, which was broadcast live from Selkirk on TSN.

Selkirk is also the home of the Selkirk Curling Club which has hosted numerous curling events, including the Masters Grand Slam of Curling in 2014, Canadian Junior Curling Championships in 1997 and the Viterra/Safeway Select Manitoba Men's Provincial Curling Championships.

Geography

Selkirk is located in the Interlake Region of Manitoba, about 22 km northeast of the provincial capital Winnipeg on the Red River. A vertical lift bridge over the Red River connects Selkirk with the smaller town of East Selkirk. The city mostly borders the Rural Municipality of St. Andrews, except to the east, where it borders the Rural Municipality of St. Clements across the Red River. The terrain is extremely flat with fields of wheat and canola surrounding the city.

Climate
Due to Selkirk's position on the edge of the Canadian Prairies, there is a moderate 510.4 mm (20.1 inches) of precipitation annually. Selkirk has a climate with four very distinct seasons. A general year will include warm (sometimes hot) summers, cold winters, and a comfortable spring and autumn. Selkirk has 21 days with snowfall per year, from about November (sometimes as early as September or October) to around April (sometimes as late as May).

General seasons
Winter: November to March
Spring: April to May
Summer: June to August
Autumn: September to October

Water 
The City of Selkirk gets its water from four carbonate aquifer wells in the City and two in the R.M. of St. Andrews. Water is then cleaned at the Selkirk Water Treatment Plant before being sent out to distribution lines. Five of the six wells are deep, while the Tower well is shallower. Because of this water from the Tower well needs more maintenance. McLean Well (drilled in 1959), Christie Well 1 (drilled in 1968. used only in emergencies), Rosser Well (drilled in 1987), Tower Well (1997), Christie Well 2 (drilled in 2015), Render Well North (drilled in 2017), Render Well South (drilled in 2017).

The Selkirk Water Tower is a prominent feature of the area. It was constructed in 1961 as a replacement for a previous tank built in 1909. The current water tower has a maximum storage capacity of 946,000 litres. In March 2020, the City announced a local design competition that would see the repainting of the  structure.

In August 2016, the City of Selkirk partnered with the provincial and federal governments to cost share upgrades to its water treatment and distribution infrastructure. The Selkirk project was estimated to cost C$35.2 million and would include a new water treatment plant. The expanded system would be large enough to serve St. Andrews and the Lower Fort Garry Historic Park.

Construction began in August 2018 to replace the aging wastewater facility built in 1976. The new one would cost C$35.9 million, the largest capital works project in the City's history, with construction expected to be completed by January 2020.

Demographics

The median household income in 2005 for Selkirk was $42,502, which is below the Manitoba provincial average of $47,875.

Places of interest 

Selkirk—Red River former federal electoral district
Selkirk Water Aerodrome
Selkirk Airport
Red River Trails
Fort Gibraltar fur-trading post destroyed by early Selkirk settlers
Fort Maurepas (Canada) fur trading post built 1734 near the present town
Selkirk Lift Bridge

Notable people

Sports

Terry Ball – hockey player
Rich Chernomaz – hockey player
Kerri Einarson – curler
Paul Goodman – hockey player
Alfie Michaud – hockey player (goaltender)
Andrew Murray – hockey player
Harry Oliver – hockey player
Bullet Joe Simpson – soldier, hockey player and coach who was flag bearer for Canada at 1932 Olympics
Jimmy Skinner – hockey coach
Neil Wilkinson – hockey player

Politicians

David Bjornson – Member of Parliament 1988–1993
Greg Dewar – Manitoba provincial politician
Ron Fewchuk – Member of Parliament 1993–1997
Ed Helwer – member of the Manitoba legislature 1988–2003
Hugh McFadyen – Manitoba politician, MLA
Howard Pawley – MLA Selkirk 1969–1988; Premier of Manitoba 1981–1988
Sam Uskiw – Manitoba politician, born in East Selkirk

Other

Trevor Boris – comedian
Paul Boyd – currently broadcasting journalistic reporter for WSOC-TV
Robert Atkinson Davis – businessman and politician, supported running the railway through Winnipeg instead of Selkirk
The Farrell Bros. – rockabilly (music) group
Goody Grace – singer and musician
Kevin Patterson – doctor, writer, grew up in Selkirk
William Prince – musician
Ellen Reid – keyboard player for the Canadian rock band Crash Test Dummies
Michael Rowe – Canadian author and journalist, attended St. John's Cathedral Boys' School in Selkirk 1977–1981
Niigaanwewidam James Sinclair, scholar
Sherisse Stevens – singer and entertainer
John Tanner – explorer, guide, worked for the Selkirk colony
Paul Thorlakson – soldier, surgeon, Order of Canada, co-founder of the Winnipeg Clinic

References

External links

 
Cities in Manitoba
Winnipeg Metro Region
Populated places in Interlake Region, Manitoba